Events from the year 1690 in China.

Incumbents 
 Kangxi Emperor (28th year)

Events 
 Dzungar–Qing Wars
 Battle of Ulan Butung
 By 1690, Galdan Boshugtu Khan of the Dzungars had moved down the Kerulen River into Rehe and was potentially in a position to threaten Beijing itself
 Kangxi commissioned his own two half-brothers, Fuquan, Prince Yu and Changning, Prince Gong, as the commanding generals, dispatching Fuquan with an army north through the pass at Gubeikou, and Changning with a second force through the Xifengkou pass. 
 The emperor also sent his eldest son Yunti, Prince Xun as an assistant to Fuquan, and was himself preparing to join the forces in the field, when he was stricken by illness. The result was victory for Galdan, who held off the imperial forces at Ulan-Butung.

Deaths
 Jangtai (1636–1690)
 Tong Guogang, Kangxi's uncle

References

 
 .

 
China